Balbeuchly (Foot) railway station served the village of Auchterhouse, Angus, Scotland, from 1831 to 1855 on the Dundee and Newtyle Railway.

History 
The station was opened on 16 December 1831 by the Dundee and Newtyle Railway. It closed in March 1853 but reopened in July 1854, only to close again in July 1855.

References

External links 

Disused railway stations in Angus, Scotland
Railway stations in Great Britain opened in 1831
Railway stations in Great Britain closed in 1855
1831 establishments in Scotland
1855 disestablishments in Scotland